Spectamen adarticulatum is a species of sea snail, a marine gastropod mollusk in the family Solariellidae.

Description
The size of the shell attains 10 mm.

Distribution
This marine species occurs off KwaZuluNatal, Rep. South Africa

References

 D.G. Herbert (1987), Revision of the Solariellinae (Mollusca Prosobranchia: Trochidae) in Southern Africa; Volume 28 van Ann. Natal Museum

External links
 To World Register of Marine Species

adarticulatum
Gastropods described in 1963